I Married Joan is an American situation comedy that aired on NBC from 1952 to 1955.  It starred actress Joan Davis as the manic, scatterbrained wife of a mild-mannered community judge (Jim Backus).

Synopsis

The show, whose syndicated opening makes the claim "America's favorite comedy show, starring America's queen of comedy, Joan Davis, as Mrs. Joan Stevens" focused on a married couple, Joan and Bradley Stevens. I Married Joan'''s trademark was broad physical slapstick, with Joan Stevens portrayed as bright but somewhat childlike and given to misunderstanding. Virtually every episode had a plot which provided star Davis with a setup for at least one scene of over-the-top physical comedy. Davis's real-life daughter, Beverly Wills, was a regular cast member for several months of the show's second season, portraying Joan's sister, Beverly Grossman. Early installments began with Backus, as Judge Stevens in chambers, recalling how one of his wife's madcap mishaps paralleled the problems of a couple seeking a divorce; this was followed by the unfolding of the episode, which ended back in chambers with Judge Stevens summing up his tale for the now-reconciled couple. This wraparound scenario was abandoned after a handful of episodes.

Sponsored by General Electric (original network openings extolled the virtues of the sponsor's products rather than those of its star), I Married Joan was aimed at the viewers who watched I Love Lucy, which had debuted the previous year and was already television's top-rated situation comedy. I Love Lucy and I Married Joan even employed the same director in each show's first season, Marc Daniels.

NBC scheduled I Married Joan Wednesdays at 8:00 ET against the first half of Arthur Godfrey and his Friends on CBS for the entirety of its three-season run. The show performed marginally during its first year, but enjoyed a surge in the Nielsen ratings during its second season in the wake of Godfrey's firing of Julius LaRosa and the resultant negative publicity. In its third year, I Married Joan withered against the additional competition of ABC's new top-rated hit Walt Disney's Disneyland and was canceled, airing its last first-run episode on March 23, 1955. Although Davis' personal health problems have also been cited as a reason for the show's cancellation, she was seen performing robust physical comedy as a guest star on variety series, years after her own show ended.

Cast

Episode list
Season 1: 1952–53

Season 2: 1953–54

Season 3: 1954–55

Release

 Syndication 
In the early 1980s, the series was rerun by the CBN cable network in a late-night block that included another TV sitcom, Gale Storm's series My Little Margie. The series was also aired on ION Television, and on the HOT (History of Television) network in New York (WKOB 42.4) and Dallas (KODF 26 and K31GL 31.3). The series currently (as of 2018) runs on AMGTV, also in a block with My Little Margie. Beginning in March 2018, the series began a weekday morning run on the Decades network.

 Home media 
Since 2004, VCI Entertainment has released 5 volumes of various episodes from different seasons on budget DVD compilations.

Other media
BearManor Media published a biography about Joan Davis, which includes a chapter dedicated to I Married Joan.'' Episodes of the series have been screened at the Mid-Atlantic Nostalgia Convention held annually in Aberdeen, Maryland.

References

External links
 

1952 American television series debuts
1955 American television series endings
1950s American sitcoms
Black-and-white American television shows
English-language television shows
NBC original programming
Television series about marriage
Television series by CBS Studios
Television shows set in California